Crete-Monee High School (CMHS) is a comprehensive public high school located in Crete, Illinois, a south suburb of Chicago, in the United States. Known colloquially as Crete, the high school houses students representing the surrounding communities of Crete, Monee, University Park, and portions of Park Forest. The student body as of 2020 was 66.0% black, 16.6% white, 13.3% Hispanic, 0.5% Asian, 0.1% American Indian, and 3.6% of two or more races. As of 2016 the 4-year graduation rate was 89%, a full three percentage points higher than the Illinois state average of 86%.

History 
The high school's current building was completed in 2007 at a cost of $60 million. Since its completion, its previous building, built in 1954 on an adjacent property, held the Crete-Monee Sixth Grade Center on its main floor. Following completion of an additional wing in 2016, the Crete-Monee Middle School now houses all students in sixth through eighth grades. As such, the old high school building (known for its athletic dome) is no longer in use by students.

Academics 
Students were previously administered the PSAE (Prairie State Achievement Exam) in their junior year to gauge performance and college readiness. This exam was a requirement under the No Child Left Behind Act. However, in 2015, this act was replaced by the Every Student Succeeds Act and the PSAE was discontinued.
The school is a participant in Project Lead the Way, a program created by a not-for-profit of the same name which works to create STEM curricula in U.S. primary and secondary schools. Advanced Placement courses are available beginning in a student's sophomore year and include options such as Language and Composition, Literature and Composition, Calculus A/B, Statistics, World History, U.S. History, Psychology and Environmental Science. Additionally, students may apply to and attend classes at Kankakee Community College in Kankakee, IL or Prairie State College in Chicago Heights, IL as part of the high school's dual credit program. As of 2016, 35.7% of students were participating in early college coursework, or high school coursework that may result in early college credit.

Activities 
Crete-Monee students participate in extracurricular activities including those listed below.

Activities offered

Athletics 

On November 23, 2012, the Warriors defeated Cary Grove High School, capturing the first state football championship in school history.

Sports offered

Notable alumni 

Alexandra Grey, is an actress and singer who plays Melody Barnes on the Fox television series Empire. 
Lance Lenoir, NFL wide receiver for the Buffalo Bills
Laquon Treadwell, NFL wide receiver for the Jacksonville Jaguars
Rudy Horne, was an American mathematician and professor at Morehouse College.
 Chris Slayton, NFL player

References

External links 
 

1948 establishments in Illinois
Educational institutions established in 1948
Public high schools in Illinois
Schools in Will County, Illinois